Sow thistle most often refers to yellow flowered, thistle-like plants in the genus Sonchus.

Sow thistle may also refer to: 
Cicerbita, a genus of plants related to Sonchus, with blue, white, or yellow flowers.

See also
 Reichardia tingitana, false sow thistle